Bodom (internationally Lake Bodom) is a 2016 Finnish slasher film directed by Taneli Mustonen. It is inspired by but not based on the 1960 Lake Bodom murders, telling the story of a group of Finnish friends, who decide to go camping by Lake Bodom to do a reconstruction of the 1960 murders, but something goes wrong.

Bodom was invited to Cannes for an event organized by the Marché du Film, for which the films were chosen by a joint jury of the organizers of the event (the Cannes Film Market and the Canadian Frontières Film Event).

Plot 
A group of friends, Nora, Elias, Atte and Ida, go to Lake Bodom to camp and reconstruct the 1960 murders there. Ida has been rejected at school for her nude pictures. Her fascination with Elias is because he is accused of taking the pictures.

At night at Bodom, with Ida and Atte in the tent, someone grabs them through the tent. Atte goes out, and a mysterious figure stabs him. Nora and Elias run to the scene, but too late. The dying Atte tells them to escape before the killer returns to the tent.

The trio tries to escape the car, but Nora's leg gives out, and she tells Elias and Ida to continue without her. Elias tries to explain to the angry Ida that he has never taken any nude pictures of her. At that moment, a mysterious figure stabs Elias from behind, killing him. Nora, who has plotted with Ida to kill Elias and Atte, who ruined Ida's life, is revealed as the killer. The girls put on protective clothing and throw the boys' bodies into Lake Bodom. The girls plan to escape with their car, but realize that the car keys are in Elias' pocket. Ida desperately dives into the lake to pick up the keys, and Nora can see movement in the woods near the lake.

Ida, on the car ride home, asks Nora if her nude photos really exist. Nora breaks down and reveals that she is in love with Ida, and could not bear to tell her. It is revealed that at a student party, Ida passed out from drinking, and Nora took her to bed to sleep. After that, Nora began to spread rumors of Ida’s nude pictures, which didn’t really exist. Nora lied to Ida that Elias had taken the pictures. Ida hoped Elias and Atte would die, at which point the duo began planning a boys' killing trip. Ida is shocked to hear the truth and threatens to tell everything, with Nora hitting her in the face with a wrench. Ida gets angry and attacks Nora, who is driving the car. The girls drive into the ditch.

An unknown man offers to help the girls and tow them to town. Nora asks Ida for the knife with which she killed Atte, but there is no knife. The girls realize that the man driving the car is a murderer, at which point the tow truck driven by the man begins to accelerate so that the girls' car flies to its roof. Ida is injured in the crash, and she is unable to move. Nora tries to escape, but the man's hound catches Nora.

Nora and Ida wake up in front of a campfire, bound and their lips glued shut. The man then kills Nora in front of Ida. At dawn, Ida wakes up in the yard of her own house in shock. The bodies of Nora and the boys are found and Ida is accused of the murders of her friends, and no one believes the truth told by Ida.

The case is widely reported and inspired by new campers arriving at Lake Bodom. But unbeknownst to everyone, the mysterious murderer still stalks all those who have entered the woods.

Cast
 Nelly Hirst-Gee as Ida
 Mimosa Willamo as Nora
 Mikael Gabriel as Elias
 Santeri Helinheimo Mäntylä as Atte
 Pirjo Lankinen as mother
 Ilkka Heiskanen as father
 Sami Eerola as hunter
 Otso Ahosola as young hunter
 Ville Saksela as teen
 Iiris Kankkunen as teen

Reception 
In his review for Ilta-Sanomat, Tarmo Poussu called Bodom "the first Finnish horror film that meets the international standards". Jutta Sarhimaa from Helsingin Sanomat gave the film four out of five stars, complimenting the young actors, visual production and dialogue.

Bodom received three Jussi Awards nominations for Best Picture, Female Lead (Mimosa Willamo) and Sound Design; it won the sound design award. Mimosa Willamo also won the best actress award at Screamfest in 2016.

References

External links

2016 films
2016 horror films
Backwoods slasher films
2010s English-language films
English-language Finnish films
2010s Finnish-language films
Finnish slasher films
Horror films based on actual events
Films directed by Taneli Mustonen
Films scored by Panu Aaltio
2016 multilingual films
Finnish multilingual films